Kim Young-Sin  (Hangul: 김영신; born 28 February 1986) is a South Korean football player who currently plays for Gangwon FC.

External links 

1986 births
Living people
South Korean footballers
Jeonbuk Hyundai Motors players
Jeju United FC players
Gimcheon Sangmu FC players
Busan IPark players
Seongnam FC players
Gangwon FC players
K League 1 players
K League 2 players
Association football midfielders